Zip & Zap and the Captain's Island is a 2016 Spanish adventure film directed by Oskar Santos and starred by Teo Planell, Toni Gómez and Elena Anaya. This is the sequel to Zip & Zap and the Marble Gang.

Cast 
 Elena Anaya as Ms. Pam
 Carolina Lapausa as the mother
 Aidan Cook as Principal Gorilla Performer
 Jorge Bosch as Pantuflo Zapatilla
 Teo Planell as Zipi (called Zip in the English version of this movie)
 Goizalde Núñez as Sor Enriqueta
 Toni Gómez as Zape (called Zap in the English version of this movie)
 Máximo Pastor as Maqui
 Tom Wilton as Gorilla
 Fermí Reixach as Jaime
 Ana Blanco de Córdova as Pipi
 Iria Castellano as Flequi
 Trinidad Iglesias
 Juan Codina as Salomón

The two siblings, Zip and Zap break into a toy store of a relative to steal some toys, in revenge of a punishment. They upset a fire, which quickly engulfs the whole store after they escaped. Thus, the duo was given a whole array of punishments, with their parents continuously inventing new ones. They expected punishment to be bad, but to their surprise, they landed on a picturesque island, where their novelist father's editor reputedly lives. They take their car and drive through a road to find a house. But their car breaks down in front of the Orphanage, where Pamela (Miss Pam) lets them stay. They are fascinated by the life the children are allowed to live there, but they still disapproved of it, since they hadn't any parents. They went to sleep at night, but found their parents missing in the morning, coming to the conclusion that they went away, leaving them there. Then in another part, they start teasing the nun, while they sang, and slowly grew accustomed to the life. Then, it is shown that the parents were kidnapped by Ms. Pam, who turned out to be the fictional editor, who converted parents to children, to keep herself company. The children, along with Flecky and Macky, their parents younger forms, find out about the kidnapping. they make run to escape, with Pipi, who is the younger form of Ms. Pam, who traps them. The intelligent gorilla, who Salomon intended to kill, saved them, and took them to his den, where they see that Pamela was obsessed with book characters, and all the helpers of her were named after characters, and were manic or criminal. They also found out that the gorilla was a detective, who was sent to investigate the disappearances, and was turned into a gorilla. Miss Pam captures them, with the help of a person who has become invisible. They are locked in a dungeon, when the butler reveals that he is the father of Pamela. then he begins the backstory of Pamela. She had lost her mom, and her father wanted to atone for that, by giving Pam all she wanted. He gave her two submarines, a tool that takes her anywhere, and the shape/age shifting machine, which only worked inside the machine. She became angry, and hated her father. He kept on laboring on the machine, and made the dome bigger. They are helped to escape, and devise a plan to steal the key fragments to escape through a submarine. They escape from the mansion, but are caught and sunk by the other submarine, after she converts her father to a frog, and told him where she kept the key which destroyed the dome. While, in the submarine, they escaped by the teleporting device, and landed in the lab. Then a scuffle ensues, and Pam captures Flecky and Macky, and shows them that they were their parents. But before she could catch the duo, they escaped, and smashed the key to destroy the dome, then indicated by the frog. The duo converts their parents back, along with all other parents, and they reunite with family finally.

References

External links 
 

2010s children's adventure films
Spanish adventure films
Spanish children's films
Films based on Spanish comics
Live-action films based on comics
Spanish sequel films
Atresmedia Cine films
MOD Producciones films
Zeta Studios films
2010s Spanish films